Osuga Glacier is a tributary glacier flowing northeast to Trafalgar Glacier just east of Mount Burton, in the Victory Mountains, Victoria Land. Mapped by United States Geological Survey (USGS) from surveys and U.S. Navy air photos, 1960–64. Named by Advisory Committee on Antarctic Names (US-ACAN) for David T. Osuga, biologist at McMurdo Station, 1966–67.

Glaciers of Victoria Land
Borchgrevink Coast